Fada Airport  is an airport serving Fada, located in the Ennedi region in Chad.

Facilities 

References

External links 
 

Airports in Chad
Ennedi-Ouest Region